Krishan Bheel (Urdu : کرشن بھیل ) (born in 1968) is a Pakistani politician. He is one of the few Hindu politicians in Pakistan and belongs to the Pakistan Muslim League (N).

Early life
He was born in Hyderabad, Sindh, Pakistan on March 1, 1968, into a Sindhi Hindu family. He received his degree from Sindh University in 1990.

Slapping incident
In Pakistan's parliament, Bheel slapped a politician. During discussions, a member of Bheel's party condemned Pervez Musharraf. An opposing politician, Qari Gul Rehman recited a qaseeda in favour of Musharraf, and was then heckled by members of Bheel's party. After proceedings Rehman, approached Bheel and called him Hindu in a derogatory manner. Bheel then slapped him three times before the fight was broken up.

References

1968 births
Living people
Pakistani Hindus
Sindhi people
Pakistan Muslim League (N) politicians